John 13 is the thirteenth chapter of the Gospel of John in the New Testament of the Christian Bible. The "latter half"  or "closing part" of John's Gospel commences with this chapter. The nineteenth-century biblical commentator Alexander Maclaren calls it "the Holy of Holies of the New Testament" and the "most sacred part of the New Testament", as it begins John's record of the events on the last night before the crucifixion of Jesus Christ, emphasising Jesus' love for His disciples, demonstrated in the service of washing their feet, and His commandment that they love one another in the same way. The author of the book containing this chapter is anonymous, but early Christian tradition uniformly affirmed that John composed this Gospel.

Text 
The original text was written in Koine Greek. This chapter is divided into 38 verses.

Textual witnesses
Some early manuscripts containing the text of this chapter in Greek are:
Papyrus 75 (AD 175–225)
Papyrus 66 (~200).
Codex Vaticanus (325-350)
Codex Sinaiticus (330-360)
Codex Bezae (~400)
Codex Alexandrinus (400-440)
Codex Ephraemi Rescriptus (~450; extant verses 8-38)
Papyrus 92 (5th century; extant verses 15–17)

An ancient manuscript containing this chapter in the Coptic language is: 
Papyrus 6 (~AD 350; extant verses 1–2, 11–12).

Places 
All the events recorded in this chapter and the succeeding chapters up to John 17 took place in Jerusalem. The precise location is not specified, but John 18:1 states that afterwards, "Jesus left with his disciples and crossed the Kidron Valley".

Old Testament references
John 13:18: Psalm

Verse 1: the appointed hour

Now before the Feast of the Passover, when Jesus knew that His hour had come that He should depart from this world to the Father, having loved His own who were in the world, He loved them to the end.
From the Greek syntax and theme perspective, evangelical scholar D. A. Carson regards verse 1 as an introduction of the whole 'Farewell Discourse', whereas verses 2–3 show the first demonstration of the full extent of Christ's love.

The narrative begins before the Feast of the Passover, when Jesus knew that His hour had come that He should depart from this world to the Father, [when] having loved His own who were in the world, He loved them to the end. The appointed hour, anticipated earlier in the gospel had now arrived.

Heinrich Meyer notes, "How long before the feast, our passage does not state", but Bengel's Gnomon and Wesley's Notes, which drew widely on Bengel, both associate this passage with the Wednesday of the week leading to the Passover. The New International Version translation says It was just before the Passover Festival. 

During or after supper, (deipnou ginomenou) the narrative explains that "Jesus knew that the Father had put all things under his power, and that he had come from God and was returning to God". The King James Version speaks of "supper being ended", whereas the American Standard Version says "during supper" and the New International Version has "the evening meal was in progress". By this time, the devil had "already put it into the heart of Judas Iscariot, Simon’s son (Ioudas Simōnos Iskariōtou), to betray Him". Alfred Plummer, in the Cambridge Bible for Schools and Colleges argues that "the true reading of τοῦ διαβόλου ἤδη βεβληκότος εἰς τὴν καρδίαν (tou diabolou ēdē beblēkotos eis tēn kardian) gives us, "The devil having now put it into the heart, that Judas, Simon's son, Iscariot should betray Him", and asks "whose heart?" Grammatically, the meaning can be read as either "the heart of the devil" or "the heart of Judas", but the received reading (i.e. "the heart of Judas") is preferred  and most English translations follow this reading. The Jerusalem Bible and J B Phillips' version both have "the mind of Judas".: The New Testament in Modern English by J.B Phillips

Jesus washes the disciples’ feet (13:2–17)

Jesus washes and dries the feet of each of His disciples. The evangelist provides a detailed account of the actions Jesus took, removing His outer garment and wrapping a towel around His waist. Scottish commentator William Robertson Nicoll says, "Each step in the whole astounding scene is imprinted on the mind of John".  says that Jesus began to wash their feet: the washing was interrupted by Peter's initial refusal to allow Jesus to wash his feet, but  suggests that the task was later completed and the feet of all the Disciples were washed, including those of Judas, as Jesus then took back His garments and reclined [at table] again.

The interruption consists of a question from Peter, "Lord (Kyrie), are You washing my feet?", Jesus' reply that at present they would not understand what He was doing, Peter's refusal to have Jesus wash his feet, Jesus' reply that "If I do not wash you, you have no part with Me", Peter's willingness to have his whole body washed by Jesus, and Jesus' closing statement that "He who is bathed needs only to wash his feet, but is completely clean; and you are clean, but not all of you". The evangelist adds a note, "He knew who would betray Him; therefore He said, “You are not all clean". Peter calls Jesus 'Lord' in two of his three statements, and Jesus later acknowledges the title as correctly used.

From verse 12 onwards, the action having been completed, Jesus explains what he has done. Henry Alford calls the foot-washing "a pattern of self-denying love for His servants". Carson sees the episode pointing in two directions: one as a symbolic spiritual cleansing and the other as a "standard of humble service", followed by a calling to the disciples to "wash one another's feet". The words "Do you know what I have done to you?" (verse 12) are uttered to introduce Jesus' teaching, but without expectation of an answer.

Jesus identifies his betrayer (13:18–30)
 Verse 18 
[Jesus says:] "I do not speak concerning all of you. I know whom I have chosen; but that the Scripture may be fulfilled, 'He who eats bread with Me has lifted up his heel against Me.'"Jesus quotes the words of Psalm :Even my close friend in whom I trusted, Who ate my bread, Has lifted up his heel against me.in shorter statement: '' ( NASB).

According to the Pulpit Commentary, in the Psalm, "Ahithophel (who had been a counsellor to King David) is almost certainly intended", and Plummer notes that "the words of the Psalm are not a direct prediction, but the treachery and the fate of Ahithophel foreshadowed the treachery and the fate of Judas". The Jerusalem Bible translates John 13:18 as "Someone who shares my table rebels against me". Francis Moloney identifies this verse not only with Judas' betrayal of Jesus, but also with Peter's denial of Him.

Indeed, the whole of John's Gospel is written so that [his readers] "may believe that Jesus is the Messiah, the Son of God, and that by believing [they] may have life in his name" ( NIV). Jesus anticipates being betrayed by one of His friends, a consideration which He finds deeply troubling. The disciples cannot imagine who Jesus might be referring to, and ask "Lord, who is it?". Jesus does not identify His betrayer by name, but provides an answer by sign:

 Verse 23 
 “One of his disciples—the one whom Jesus loved—was reclining next to him.”
The formal introduction of the Beloved Disciple is a “stunningly apparent” stroke of "narrative genius", for he is introduced immediately after Jesus demonstrates his love for the disciples in the act of washing the disciples’ feet and immediately before the commandment to “love one another just as I have loved you”. The framing device places the Beloved Disciple at "center stage", highlighting his importance in the Gospel and his special relationship with Jesus. His position next to Jesus (literally, the one “who is in the bosom of Jesus”) describes not only his proximity to Jesus at the supper but also his “closest communion” with him.

 Verse 26 "It is he to whom I shall give a piece of bread when I have dipped it." The text refers to "the piece" or "morsel"  or "sop"  of bread (to psómion), and William Robertson Nicoll states that "some argue from the insertion of the article τὸ that this was the sop made up of a morsel of lamb, a small piece of unleavened bread, and dipped in the bitter sauce, which was given by the head of the house to each guest as a regular part of the Passover; and that therefore John as well as the Synoptists considered this to be the Paschal Supper. But not only is the article doubtful, but it is an ordinary Oriental custom for the host to offer such a tid-bit to any favoured guest; and we are rather entitled to see in the act the last appeal to Judas’ better feeling. The very mark Jesus chooses to single him out is one which on ordinary occasions was a mark of distinctive favour".

The word γλωσσοκομον (glōssokomon) "means literally "a case for mouthpieces" of musical instruments, and hence any portable chest.

Verse 30Having received the piece of bread, he then went out immediately. And it was night.Judas left immediately, and of his own free will. After his departure, Jesus provides no further explanation to address the Disciples' question. Instead, the evangelist moves the narrative forward. It is now night-time (Tzet Hakochavim) and therefore the day of the Passover has begun.

The New Commandment (13:31–35)

The discourse which Jesus commences after Judas' departure - "the solemn valedictory discourse of our Lord"  - begins with three topics:

 Verses 31–32 "Now the Son of Man is glorified, and God is glorified in Him. If God is glorified in Him, God will also glorify Him in Himself, and glorify Him immediately." Verses 33 Little children, I shall be with you a little while longer. You will seek Me; and as I said to the Jews, ‘Where I am going, you cannot come,’ so now I say to you."Jesus has said to the Jews, Where I am going, you cannot come, so now he says [the same] to his disciples.

 Verses 34–35 "A new commandment I give to you, that you love one another; as I have loved you, that you also love one another. By this all will know that you are My disciples, if you have love for one another"Jesus predicts Peter’s denial (13:36–38)
"Judas is already beginning that series of events which will end in sending Jesus away from them to the Father". Just as Judas had left "immediately", (eutheōs)  so the glorification of God begins "immediately" (euthys). Maclaren identifies three forms of glorification presented here:
the Son of Man is glorified in His Cross
God is glorified in the Son of Man
the Son of Man is glorified in the Father.

Many commentators note the tenderness of this word. Theologian Harold Buls suggests "it denotes endearment. It likely also indicates the disciples' immaturity and weakness". Jesus tells His disciples that shortly He will be leaving them; where He is going they cannot come (John 13:33), or at any rate they "cannot follow now, but ... will follow later". The apostles Peter (in verse 37), Thomas and Philip (in the next chapter) raise questions about where Jesus is going. Peter seems to have recognised the connection between following Jesus and dying: "Lord, why can I not follow you now? I will lay down my life for you"  or "on your behalf". Jesus questions whether Peter will lay down his life for Him and tells him that in fact he will have denied Jesus three times "before the rooster crows" (cf. ).

See also 
 Farewell Discourse
 Jerusalem
 Jesus Christ
 Judas Iscariot
 Old Testament messianic prophecies quoted in the New Testament
 Simon Peter
 Other related Bible parts: Psalm 41, Matthew 26, Mark 14, Luke 22

References

Bibliography

External links
 King James Bible - Wikisource
English Translation with Parallel Latin Vulgate 
Online Bible at GospelHall.org (ESV, KJV, Darby, American Standard Version, Bible in Basic English)
Multiple bible versions at Bible Gateway (NKJV, NIV, NRSV etc.)

John 13